Buckinghamia ferruginiflora, also known as Noah's oak or spotted oak, is a species of rainforest tree in the protea family, one of two in the genus that is endemic to the Wet Tropics of Queensland, north-eastern Australia. Although the tree's differences from its congener had been known since the 1970s, it was only formally described by Donald Foreman and Bernard Hyland in 1988 in the journal Muelleria.

Description

Distribution and habitat
The species is restricted to the area between Bloomfield and the Daintree River, in mature lowland and upland rainforest, with an altitudinal range from sea level to 350 m.

References

ferruginiflora
Flora of Queensland
Endemic flora of Australia
Proteales of Australia
Taxa named by Bernard Hyland
Taxa named by Don Foreman
Plants described in 1988